Notholaena ferruginea is a species name, which may refer to:

Notholaena trichomanoides, described in 1813 as Notholaena ferruginea (Desv.) Desv.
Myriopteris aurea, described in 1864 as Notholaena ferruginea (Willd. ex Link) Hook.

ferruginea